Royal Air Force Bellasize, also known as RAF Bellasize, was a former RAF airfield in the hamlet of Bellasize, near Gilberdyke, East Riding of Yorkshire, England. Originally opened in 1916, Bellasize was one of only four Yorkshire-based RAF locations to see use in the First and Second World Wars. Flying at Bellasize was sporadic and training based, with the site not being used in an offensive capacity during the Second World War.

History
Bellasize appears to have been equipped with just one runway, which was a grass strip measuring  angled in a north east/south west direction across a rectangular field. There are no records of any hangars or permanent buildings at the site.

The site was opened in April 1916 as a 1st class landing ground. The site was handed over to the Royal Air Force in April 1918, and then relinquished a year later in April 1919.

Bellasize was one of only four sites used by the RAF in the First and Second World Wars, (the other being Driffield, Doncaster and Catterick). For the entire period of the war, Bellasize belonged to Flying Training Command, and was used as relief landing ground (RLG) by No. 4 Elementary Flying Training School (No. 4 EFTS). No. 4 EFTS was based at nearby Brough Aerodrome, and the increased use of Bellasize was due to the prevalance of aircraft movements at Brough originating from the aircraft factory. Flying at RAF Bellasize ceased in July 1945.

The site has been converted back to farmland.

Notes

References

Sources

Royal Air Force stations in Yorkshire
History of the East Riding of Yorkshire
Royal Air Force stations of World War I in the United Kingdom
Royal Air Force stations of World War II in the United Kingdom